Llano Grande is a corregimiento in La Mesa District, Veraguas Province, Panama with a population of 815 as of 2010. Its population as of 1990 was 776; its population as of 2000 was 776.

References

Corregimientos of Veraguas Province